Cleopatra Entertainment is the film division of long time Los Angeles-based indie label Cleopatra Records, most known for promoting dark and experimental music. Founded in 2015, the company has distributed, developed, and produced several films most of which have a strong horror and/or music component. The company has focused primarily on the home video market through partnerships with New York-based film distributor The Orchard as well as AMPED Music Distribution, and MVD Entertainment Group.

History
Cleopatra Entertainment officially began in 2015 with the U.S. release of "Forever and a Day", a documentary/concert film about German heavy metal band Scorpions This was followed in August of the same year by the company's first major production, Alleluia! The Devil's Carnival, the second installment of the cult horror musical franchise from director Darren Lynn Bousman (director of several installments in the Saw series) and writer Terrance Zdunich (of Repo! The Genetic Opera). In addition to financing the film, Cleopatra produced the Blu-ray and DVD releases and also released the official CD soundtrack, which included all of the musical numbers from the film featuring Paul Sorvino, Barry Bostwick, David Hasselhoff, Ted Neeley, Tech N9ne, Emilie Autumn, Adam Pascal, Butcher Babies and Nivek Ogre.

In 2016, Cleopatra Entertainment released its second music documentary to the home video market, this one about UK punk band The Damned, called Don’t You Wish That We Were Dead, which premiered a year earlier at the SXSW Film Festival.

Cleopatra Entertainment also purchased the vampire thriller Blood Trap, starring Gianni Capaldi , Costas Mandylor and Vinnie Jones, and released it to the home video market in October of that year. Also in October 2016, Cleopatra brought the dark romantic comedy StalkHer, starring John Jarratt and Kaarin Fairfax, to US audiences. The company will also see a theatrical release for the film A Street Cat Named Bob, based on the book of the same name by James Bowen.

Coming productions for the company include more thrillers such as The Devil's Domain (starring Michael Madsen), The Black Room (starring Lin Shaye), and The 27 Club. In 2017, the company released England is Mine, the biopic of the Smiths frontman Morrissey and Street Survivors, based on a plane crash involving band Lynyrd Skynyrd, co-written by Skynyrd drummer Artimus Pyle, one of the members who survived the incident.

Films

2015

2016

2017

2018

2019

2020

References

External links 
 Official website

Film production companies of the United States
American companies established in 2015